Ancylodactylus spinicollis is a species of gecko endemic to western Africa.

References

Ancylodactylus
Reptiles described in 1907